Ben Coakwell (born June 25, 1987) is a Canadian Olympic bobsledder. He is a former Canadian football running back, who played CIS football with the Saskatchewan Huskies.

Career
In January 2022, Coakwell was named to Canada's 2022 Olympic team, his third games. Coakwell would go onto win the bronze medal in the Four-man event.

References

External links

1987 births
Living people
Bobsledders at the 2014 Winter Olympics
Bobsledders at the 2018 Winter Olympics
Bobsledders at the 2022 Winter Olympics
Canadian male bobsledders
Olympic bobsledders of Canada
Players of Canadian football from Saskatchewan
Saskatchewan Huskies football players
Sportspeople from Regina, Saskatchewan
Olympic bronze medalists for Canada
Medalists at the 2022 Winter Olympics
Olympic medalists in bobsleigh